Mulan County is a county of Heilongjiang Province, Northeast China, it is under the administration of the prefecture-level city of Harbin, the capital of Heilongjiang. It borders Tonghe County to the east, Fangzheng County to the southeast, Bin County to the south, and Bayan County to the west, as well as the prefecture-level city of Suihua to the north. The county is not related to Chinese figure Hua Mulan.

Administrative divisions 
Mulan County is divided into 6 towns and 2 townships. 
6 towns
 Mulan, Dongxing, Dagui, Lidong, Liuhe, Xinmin
2 townships
 Jianguo, Jixing

Demographics

Climate

References

External links
  Government site - 

Mulan